is a railway station in the city of Inazawa, Aichi Prefecture, Japan, operated by Meitetsu.

Lines

Station layout
The station has one side platform serving a single bi-directional track. The station has automated ticket machines, Manaca automated turnstiles and is unattended.

Adjacent stations

|-
!colspan=5|Meitetsu

Station history
Yamazaki Station was opened on January 25, 1930.

Passenger statistics
In fiscal 2017, the station was used by an average of 1,077 passengers daily.

Surrounding area
Yamada Dobby Co Ltd
Yamazaki Elementary School

See also
 List of Railway Stations in Japan

References

External links

 Official web page 

Railway stations in Japan opened in 1930
Railway stations in Aichi Prefecture
Stations of Nagoya Railroad
Inazawa